Foster Horan (born 3 November 1992) is an Irish rugby union player who plays as a forward for the Ireland national rugby sevens team. He debuted for the Ireland national sevens team at the 2018 London Sevens.

Horan played youth rugby with the Gorey Rugby Club up to the under-12 level, before going to Kilkenny College. Horan played outside centre for the Ireland national under-20 rugby union team at the 2012 IRB Junior World Championship in South Africa, where Ireland finished fifth after wins against South Africa, England, and France.

References

External links
 
 
 

Irish rugby union players
Living people
1992 births
Olympic rugby sevens players of Ireland
Rugby sevens players at the 2020 Summer Olympics